Orodesma apicina is a species of moth in the family Erebidae first described by Gottlieb August Wilhelm Herrich-Schäffer in 1868. The species is found in Florida, Central America and Cuba. It is sometimes recorded in Great Britain through accidental importation in produce.

References

Moths described in 1868
Melipotini